is a trans-Neptunian object and scattered disc object in the outermost part of the Solar System. It was first observed on 19 September 2014 by astronomers Scott Sheppard and Chad Trujillo at Cerro Tololo Observatory, Chile, and revealed on 29 August 2016. It currently has a magnitude of 24.12.

References

External links 
 
 
 

Minor planet object articles (unnumbered)
20140919